Joseph Wellington Hunkin  (25 September 188728 October 1950) was the eighth Bishop of Truro from 1935 to 1950.

He was born on 25 September 1887 at Truro and educated at Truro College, the Leys School and Gonville and Caius College, Cambridge. Made deacon on St Matthew's Day 1913 (21 September) and ordained priest at Michaelmas 1914 (27 September) — both times by Archibald Robertson, Bishop of Exeter, at Exeter Cathedral, he began his career with a curacy at St Andrew's, Plymouth. He was then a chaplain in the British Armed Forces during World War I and after that Dean of Chapel at Caius (his undergraduate college). From 1927 until his ascension to the episcopate he was Archdeacon of Coventry and an Honorary Chaplain to the King. He was consecrated a bishop by Cosmo Lang, Archbishop of Canterbury, at St Paul's Cathedral on Whit Tuesday 1935 (11 June). In 1938 he volunteered to be chaplain to the British Legion Volunteer Police Force.

He died on 28 October 1950. He was a strong Evangelical and noted for his pastoral work. He was the chair of a commission to produce a new English translation of the Bible from 1948 to 1950. Hunkin used as his pastoral staff a shepherd's crook of iron with a wooden shaft bound with a silver band inscribed "Un para, un bugel" (Cornish for "One flock, one shepherd") and enlisted in the Home Guard during the Second World War. A keen gardener, he was commemorated by a garden in the cathedral close and a shrub donated to every parish. He had become a Doctor of Divinity (DD).

Writings
Among his published works,
 Is it Reasonable to Believe? (1935) London: Hodder & Stoughton.
 From a Cornish Bishop's Garden (2001), Penzance: Alison Hodge – a collection of newspaper articles from The Guardian, (an Anglican weekly newspaper) edited and introduced by Douglas Pett.

References

1887 births
1950 deaths
20th-century Church of England bishops
Archdeacons of Coventry
Bishops of Truro
Fellows of Gonville and Caius College, Cambridge
Honorary Chaplains to the King
Officers of the Order of the British Empire
People educated at The Leys School
Recipients of the Military Cross
Royal Army Chaplains' Department officers
World War I chaplains
Clergy from Cornwall